Ixiolite is an accessory oxide mineral found in granitic pegmatites.

Structure
Ixiolite was originally reported as crystallizing in the monoclinic crystal system. Detailed studies of the scandium, tin and titanium rich varieties indicate that they form crystals in the orthorhombic system whereas tungsten ixiolite is monoclinic.

Discovery and occurrence
It was first described in 1857 for an occurrence at Skogsböle, Kimito Island, Finland. The name is for Ixion, the Greek mythological character related to Tantalus, as the mineral contains tantalum.

Ixiolite is typically associated with feldspar, tapiolite, cassiterite, microlite, and rutile.

Substitution and varieties
Trace elements include zirconium, hafnium, titanium and tungsten. 

As with other tantalum and niobium bearing minerals considerable substitution and a number of varieties exist. 
Substitutions in the formula are common and the varieties stannian ixiolite (tin), titanian ixiolite (titanium) and wolframian ixiolite (tungsten) have been reported.

Scandium is present in many ixiolite sample with percentages up to 4.0 percent Sc2O3, but usually less than one percent scandium oxide. High scandium ixiolites, containing from 4 to 19% scandium oxide are typically also rich in tin and titanium.

Economic importance
Ixiolite together with microlite, tantalite, tapiolite, wodginite are the most important minerals mined for the element tantalum. Ixiolite contains about 69 % tantalum oxide (Ta2O5) and is a common constituent of coltan ore.

Further reading
 
 
 The crystal structures of tantalite, ixiolite and wodginite from Bernic Lake, Manitoba; II, Wodginite

References

Oxide minerals
Orthorhombic minerals
Minerals in space group 60